Mauritania–Turkey relations are the foreign relations between Mauritania and Turkey. The Turkish embassy in Nouakchott opened in April 2011.

History 

Throughout the 1960s, Mauritania's main pro-French foreign policy objective was preserving its independence in the face of Moroccan irredentism.

Through the early 1970s, Mauritania continued to play the role of bridge between the Maghrib and sub-Saharan Africa.

Since late 1980s, Mauritania cultivated ties with Turkey as a possible source of aid and investment. Turkey, in return, has provided it with substantial amounts of economic aid and through TIKA funded the construction of hospitals, schools, power plants and roads.

Presidential Visits

Economic Relations  

Trade volume between the two countries was 245 million USD in 2019.

There are direct flights from Istanbul to Nouakchott.

See also 

 Foreign relations of Mauritania
 Foreign relations of Turkey

References 

 
Turkey
Bilateral relations of Turkey